The shooting of Abdullahi "Abdi" Omar Mohamed occurred in Salt Lake City, Utah, on February 27, 2016. Mohamed, a 17-year-old Somali refugee, was shot and injured by police after allegedly being involved in a confrontation with another person. Mohamed was armed with a metal broomstick, and was asked to drop it by responding officers. On August 8, 2016, the Salt Lake County District Attorney's office declined to file charges against the officers involved. The shooting was recorded on officers' body cameras and the footage was released to the public after it was shown in court on January 23, 2017.

Abdi Mohamed
Mohamed was born in April 1998 in Somalia, and had lived in a refugee camp in Kenya. He moved to Utah with his family when he was six years old.

The shooting and unrest
At 8:00 p.m., Mohamed became involved in an altercation with another man at 200 South Rio Grande Street in downtown Salt Lake City when officers were called to the scene. According to Salt Lake County prosecutors, Mohamed was involved in a fight after a failed drug deal and dispute over $1.10 near a homeless shelter. A man had come into the homeless shelter to obtain food, and asked Mohamed for marijuana, but he only had methamphetamine. Mohamed then demanded the man's money. Mohamed was holding a metal broomstick at the time, and had used it to hit the other man at least once. Responding officers asked Mohamed to drop the broomstick at least ten times. When he did not drop the broomstick and appeared to try to hit the man again, he was shot four times by officers Kory Checketts and Jordan Winegar. Mohamed's family disputed the claim, and his cousin, Muslima Weledi, said that witnesses told her Mohamed was armed with a wooden broomstick. The man battered with the broomstick received welts and bruises. Abdullahi was left in critical condition.

Following the shooting, many locals in the downtown area began to throw rocks and bottles at police. The police deployed 100 riot officers and barricaded four city blocks.

Aftermath
Mohamed became comatose following his injuries, and had awoken from his medically-induced coma on March 13.

Legal proceedings
On August 8, 2016, Salt Lake County District Attorney Sim Gill said that no charges would be filed against officers Kory Checketts and Jordan Winegar. He said that the two officers believed that Mohamed was about to seriously injure or kill a man with a metal pole. While the shooting was recorded on the officers' body cameras, prosecutors declined to release the footage to the public until January 2017. Mohamed faces charges in juvenile court of aggravated robbery and possessing drugs with an intent to distribute after officers said they found methamphetamine in his pocket.  On January 23, 2017, a preliminary hearing was held in juvenile court. In June 2017, Mohamed was released from the juvenile court system with a $500 fee. As part of the plea bargain, he admitted to aggravated assault and drug possession.

Response
Protests followed in the days after the incident, criticizing the police's use of force. On February 29, 1,000 people rallied and marched in Salt Lake City. The American Civil Liberties Union criticized the police use of force and riot removal tactics.

A group, Utah Against Police Brutality, planned to protest on August 9 in downtown Salt Lake City, in response to the district attorney's decision to not file charges against the officers involved.

See also
 Glenville shootout
 Shooting of Michael Brown

References

2016 in Utah
2016 riots
Black Lives Matter
February 2016 events in the United States
2010s in Salt Lake City
Law enforcement in Utah
Protests in the United States
Race and crime in the United States
Somali-American history
Non-fatal shootings
Salt Lake City Police Department